Chachoengsao Hi-Tek Football Club, commonly referred to as "Padrew", is a Thai professional football club based in Chachoengsao Province. They have played in the Thai League 3 Northern region. The club's home stadium is Pimpayachan Stadium. The club founded in 1997 to play semi-professional football tournament in Thailand until 2007, they can promote to play in Thailand professional football league. The club's nickname is "The Fighting Fish" (Thai: Pla Kud Nak Su), the most popular fish in the province. The club is currently playing in the Thai League 3 Eastern region.

History
At first, when Chachoengsao FC was still an amateur club (club first name is Look Luang Phor Sothon FC), they used to complete in the Yamaha Thailand Cup.
In 1997, they managed to pass the eastern group stage and were promoted to the regional level (division 2). Chachoengsao FC would join Thai Division 1 League in 2007.
But they couldn't compete at this level, and were immediately relegated to Division 2, after just one season.
Since then, Chachoengsao FC has good performance in second division, and nearly to qualify for the play-offs in 2010–2011. In addition, in 2011 season, Akarawin Sawasdee, the striker No.16 got the top goal scores and best striker awards in 2011 Thai Division 2 League Central & Eastern Region.
In 2012 season, the Thailand Tobacco Monopoly support team for main sponsor.

Stadium
Chachoengsao Province has 2 football stadiums, When they first race in TFA tournament Chachoengsao F.C. used the provincial stadium to play their home matches. In 2008, there are a lot of supporter and the provincial stadium had insufficient seats, in addition, provincial stadium be used for another activities of province, then they are move to use Chachoengsao Province Stadium or Subin Pimpayachan Stadium for race football in home match only. The Subin Pimpayachan Stadium has built for commemorate to "Mr.Subin Pimpayachan", the important people of province. The stadium have capacity 3,778 seat.

Supporters
The supporters of Chachoengsao FC called "Fighting Fish Friend" (Thai; Puen Pla Kad). They used No.8 for a symbol, because the No.8 come from "Pad" (Thai; Pad = Eight, 8) in "Padrew". In 2010, the team gave the No.8 to Chachoengsao F.C. supporters.

Timeline

History of events of Chachoengsao FC

Stadium and locations

Season by season record

Players

Current squad

Coaching staff

Honours

Regional League Central-East Division
Runner-up (1): 2015

References

External links
 Official Website
 Official Facebookpage

Association football clubs established in 1997
Football clubs in Thailand
Chachoengsao province
1997 establishments in Thailand